Teres Ridge (Hrebet Teres \'hre-bet 'te-res\) is a ridge of elevation 330 m extending 2 km in north-south direction and 1.2 km in east-west direction near Siddins Point on the Hero Bay coast of Livingston Island in the South Shetland Islands, Antarctica surmounting Tundzha Glacier to the southwest and Saedinenie Snowfield to the southeast and east.  Ice-free northeastern and northern slopes.

The ridge is named after the Thracian King Teres I, 480-440 BC.

Location

Maps
 L.L. Ivanov et al. Antarctica: Livingston Island and Greenwich Island, South Shetland Islands. Scale 1:100000 topographic map. Sofia: Antarctic Place-names Commission of Bulgaria, 2005.
 L.L. Ivanov. Antarctica: Livingston Island and Greenwich, Robert, Snow and Smith Islands. Scale 1:120000 topographic map. Troyan: Manfred Wörner Foundation, 2010.  (First edition 2009. )
 Antarctic Digital Database (ADD). Scale 1:250000 topographic map of Antarctica. Scientific Committee on Antarctic Research (SCAR). Since 1993, regularly upgraded and updated.
 L.L. Ivanov. Antarctica: Livingston Island and Smith Island. Scale 1:100000 topographic map. Manfred Wörner Foundation, 2017.

References
 Teres Ridge. SCAR Composite Antarctic Gazetteer
 Bulgarian Antarctic Gazetteer. Antarctic Place-names Commission. (details in Bulgarian, basic data in English)

External links
 Teres Ridge. Copernix satellite image

Ridges of Livingston Island